Since the five-week voyage of Christopher Columbus in 1492, crossing the Atlantic Ocean, quickly and safely, between Europe and the Americas has always been an important issue. Today, the route has become a classic one among skippers. The record is one of the most prestigious, next to the Jules Verne Trophy, for which it is often a good preparation.

This record can be achieved both ways: from west to east or from east to west. It can also be homologated single-handed or crewed, on monohulls or on multihulls.
It is homologated, since 1972, by the WSSRC

From west to east

This route is the fastest, as it follows the prevailing westerlies. It is the one that meets the most interest among skippers. 
The crossing must be made from Ambrose Light of New York to an imaginary line linking Lizard Point, Cornwall to Ushant.

Crewed

Single-handed

From east to west
It was also called Route of the discovery in honor of Christopher Columbus and his 1492 crossing.

Crewed

Bermuda to Plymouth
2,870 nautical miles

Dakar to Guadeloupe
2,551 nautical miles

Plymouth to Newport
2,800 nautical miles

Notes and references

See also 
 World Sailing Speed Record Council
 Passage sailing record
 Single-Handed Trans-Atlantic Race
 Transatlantic crossing
 Blue Riband
 Speed sailing record

Sailing records
Sailing record